Sergey Ivanovich Kalyakin (born 16 June 1952) is a Belarusian opposition politician who is the current leader of the Belarusian Left Party "A Just World", until 2009 known as the Party of Communists of Belarus. He is the nephew of Mikalay Dzyemyantsyey, former chairman of the Supreme Soviet of the Byelorussian Soviet Socialist Republic.

In 1977 he graduated from the Belarusian State University of Informatics and Radioelectronics, becoming a radio engineer. In 1992, he received a diploma of political science at the Belarusian State University. He was a member of the Communist Party of the Soviet Union from 1977 until the dissolution of the Soviet Union in 1991. Following the 1991 declaration of independence of Belarus, he joined the newly-formed Party of Belarusian Communists.

Kalyakin was a candidate for presidency in Belarus in 2001, 2006, and 2015. Following his defeat in the 2006 opposition primary, he assisted the ultimately-unsuccessful campaign of Alaksandar Milinkievič against incumbent Alexander Lukashenko. In 2009, he was elected chairman of the Belarusian Left Party.

Notes

References 

1952 births
Living people
Politicians from Minsk
Candidates for President of Belarus